Choceň is a town in Ústí nad Orlicí District in the Pardubice Region of the Czech Republic. It has about 8,500 inhabitants.

Administrative parts
Villages of Březenice, Dvořisko, Hemže, Nová Ves, Plchůvky and Podrážek are administrative parts of Choceň. Nová Ves and Plchůvky form an exclave of the municipal territory.

Geography
It lies in the Orlice Table. The Tichá Orlice river flows through the town.

History

The first written mention of Choceň is from 1227. In 1292, it was already a market town and was owned by King Wenceslaus II. In the early 14th century, it was acquired by Mikuláš of Potštejn, who founded a castle here. Mikuláš undertook marauding expeditions to the surrounding area. In 1339, the army of Charles IV conquered Choceň, demolished the castle and killed Mikuláš.

During next centuries, Choceň often changed owners. During the rule of Zikmund of Šelmberk, the town experienced a boom. He had a castle with a large courtyard built here in 1562. The next boom was during the rule of Kinsky family in the 18th century. Several architectionally valuable Baroque building were built here, including the new Church of Saint Francis of Assisi, the rectory and the belfry. In 1829, the castle was rebuilt to its current Neoclassical form.

In 1845, the railway from Prague to Olomouc via Choceň was built. In 1875 and 1881 the railways to Broumov and Litomyšl were built and Choceň became an important railway junction.

Demographics

Economy
Since 1928, there is a significant dairy company Choceňská mlékárna in the town.

Transport
Choceň is situated on a main railway link between Prague, Pardubice, Ústí nad Orlicí and Brno, and is served by Choceň railway station.

Notable people
Wenzel Thomas Matiegka (1773–1830), composer
Ulrich, 10th Prince Kinsky of Wchinitz and Tettau (1893–1938), nobleman
Richard Rychtarik (1894–1982), Czech-American set and costume designer
Leoš Šimánek (born 1946), traveler and writer
František Sisr (born 1993), cyclist

References

External links

Cities and towns in the Czech Republic
Populated places in Ústí nad Orlicí District